John Loader Maffey, 1st Baron Rugby, (1 July 1877 – 20 April 1969) was a British civil servant and diplomat who was a key figure in Anglo-Irish relations during the Second World War.

Biography

Early life
Maffey was the younger son of Thomas Maffey, a commercial traveller of Rugby, Warwickshire, and his wife, Mary Penelope, daughter of John Loader. He was educated at Rugby School and Christ Church, Oxford.

Career
He entered the Indian Civil Service in 1899, and notably served as Assistant Secretary to the Chief Commissioner of North-West-Frontier-Province from 1912 to 1916 and then as Private Secretary to the Viceroy of India Lord Chelmsford from 1916 to 1920 and then Chief Commissioner of the North-West Frontier Province from 1921 to 1924. After a disagreement with the British government in 1924, Maffey resigned from the Indian Civil Service. In 1926 he became Governor-General of Sudan, followed in 1933 by his appointment as Permanent Under-Secretary of State for the Colonies.

Representative to Ireland

On 14 September 1939, two weeks after the outbreak of World War II, Maffey arrived in Dublin to discuss the possibility of the United Kingdom appointing a British representative to Ireland. Later, following a discussion at the British War Cabinet, Maffey was sent back to Dublin again with a letter from Prime Minister Neville Chamberlain appealing once again for the appointment of a 'representative'. The United Kingdom would not agree to appoint an ambassador or a minister, because it would imply that Ireland was a foreign country outside the Commonwealth. On the other hand, Ireland would not agree to the appointment of a High Commissioner to Ireland because that would imply that Ireland was in the Commonwealth which the Irish government did not accept. As a compromise, Chamberlain proposed the title "United Kingdom Representative in Éire" but de Valera rejected this, insisting that the word 'in' be replaced with 'to'. And so "United Kingdom Representative to Éire" was agreed upon and Maffey was appointed on 3 October 1939. For de Valera, the change signified Ireland's independence, sovereignty and equality with the United Kingdom.

Chamberlain remarked that the title would "seem to be well suited to an appointment such as this which is essentially an emergency arrangement intended to meet a temporary but urgent situation". After Maffey took up his appointment as "Representative", there were reports that the Irish Republican Army might abduct or kill him.

Maffey held the post throughout the war years and until his retirement in 1949. During the war, he was undoubtedly the most important foreign diplomat resident in Dublin, given the complications of Ireland's neutrality policy. As "United Kingdom Representative to Eire", Maffey quickly established a good working relationship with Éamon de Valera. De Valera was personally in favour of the survival of democracy but did not necessarily trust the British to look after Ireland's best interests. Maffey was vital in mediating between the 'Warlord' Churchill and 'the Chief' de Valera.

When de Valera was replaced by a coalition, headed by John A. Costello, in 1948, Maffey again established a good working relationship with its members, but he was scathing about the clumsy manner in which the declaration of a Republic was handled: "Mr. Costello has handled the business in a slipshod and amateur fashion".

He encouraged John Betjeman, the press attaché, to establish friendly relations with leading and rising figures in the Dublin literary world, such as Patrick Kavanagh; Maffey himself suggested the subject for one of Kavanagh's poems.

In his memorandum, "The Irish Question in 1945", addressed to the Secretary of State for the Dominions, Maffey expressed his view: "To-day, after six years' detachment, Eire is more than ever a foreign country. It is so dominated by the National Catholic Church as to be almost a theocratic State. Gaelic is enforced in order to show that Eire is not one of the English-speaking nations; foreign games are frowned upon, the war censorship has been misapplied for anti-British purposes, anti-British feeling is fostered in school and by Church and State by a system of hereditary enemy indoctrination. There is probably more widespread anti-British sentiment in Eire to-day than ever before." Commenting on a recent attack by Churchill on de Valera, Maffey reported "Nothing helped Mr. de Valera more than Mr. Churchill's personal attack.... The Irish are a very distinct race, and their marked characteristics persist strongly.... There still persist the dark Milesian strain, the tribal vendetta spirit, hatred and blarney, religious fanaticism, swift alternations between cruelty and laughter. A knowledge of the North-West Frontier tribes of India is a good introduction to an understanding of the Irish. They are both very remarkable and in many ways attractive people, with the same mental kinks. We were wise enough not to attempt to bring the Afridis under our direct rule." He continued "Mr. de Valera is not himself a hater of England, as Mr. Frank Aiken, the Finance Minister, is.... There is very little of the Irishman in Mr. de Valera. He is trusted because of his austerity and his cold mathematical approach to Anglo-Irish problems. He understands the narrowness of the Irish mind and does not venture on to broader paths, though he might certainly have led his people out of spiritual bondage in 1941, when America came into the war."

Maffey felt that "we can now talk to Eire on a cold, factual, horse-trading basis, knowing perfectly well that the cards are in our hands." He continued, "It must be admitted that, by ascribing Dominion status to Eire, we placed in unfriendly hands a power to weaken the conception and responsibilities of Dominion status. Eire has none of the attributes of a Dominion. She is a "Scotland " gone wrong, and we cannot afford to let her be completely divorced from the strategic and economic zone of England, Scotland and Wales." Turning to Northern Ireland, Maffey remarked, "Unhappily it is not possible for us to feel satisfied with the state of affairs in Northern Ireland. The Unionist Government are fighting an insidious enemy who is gaining upon them. Their ballot box is not safe over a period against the Catholic birth rate. The loyalty of the local garrison is not proof against the attractions of a lower income-tax rate in Eire. They are vulnerable to world criticism. The British Government cannot afford to ignore the pronouncement made in November 1944 by the Catholic Archbishop of Westminster, the Most Rev. Dr. Griffin, that there is religious persecution at the present day in Northern Ireland."

In February 1947, Maffey was raised to the peerage as Baron Rugby, of Rugby in the County of Warwick.

His portrait hangs in the National Portrait Gallery of the United Kingdom. Painted by Philip de László in 1923, it was the study for two official portraits, at Government House, Peshawar, and Christ Church, Oxford.

Family
Lord Rugby married Dorothy Gladys Huggins, daughter of Charles Lang Huggins, on 28 August 1907. They became the parents of three children: Alan, Henry, and Penelope.

Their only daughter, Penelope, married the war hero and Tory MP Sir William Aitken and became a well-known socialite. She was the mother of the former Conservative politician Jonathan Aitken and the actress Maria Aitken. Her grandchildren are the actor Jack Davenport, the artiste and environmentalist Alexandra Aitken (also known as Uttrang Kaur Khalsa), Victoria Aitken, and William Aitken.

Lord Rugby died in April 1969, aged 91. He was succeeded in the barony by his eldest son Alan Loader Maffey, 2nd Baron Rugby.

Popular culture
Maffey was played by Peter Copley in the 1983 RTÉ drama series Caught in a Free State.

He is a minor character in the 2010 novel Long Time Coming by Robert Goddard.

Arms

See also
List of Ambassadors from the United Kingdom to Ireland

References

Oxbury, Harold. Great Britons: Twentieth-Century Lives. London: Promotional Reprint Company Ltd, 1993.
Kidd, Charles, Williamson, David (editors). Debrett's Peerage and Baronetage (1990 edition). New York: St Martin's Press, 1990.

1877 births
1969 deaths
British politicians of then-British possessions
Maffey, John
Ambassadors of the United Kingdom to Ireland
Maffey, John
Companions of the Order of the Indian Empire
Companions of the Order of the Star of India
Diplomatic peers
Knights Commander of the Order of the Bath
Knights Commander of the Royal Victorian Order
Knights Grand Cross of the Order of St Michael and St George
Civil servants in the Colonial Office
Maffey John
Barons created by George VI